The Scandinavian Indoor Championships  also known as the Scandinavian Covered Court Championships  and the Scandinavian Indoor Open  was a combined men's and women's tennis tournament held from 1936 through 1979.

History
The tournament was created to celebrate the 30th anniversary of the Swedish Lawn Tennis Association and was first held on the indoor courts of the B-Hall in Stockholm. The location of the tournament alternated between the four Scandinavian capitals Copenhagen, Helsinki, Stockholm and Oslo and the event was usually held at the end of January or the beginning of February. The competitors were mainly European players. The tournament struggled in Open Era, the mixed doubles event was cancelled in 1971, and the championships were abolished in 1979.

Champions

Event names
 Scandinavian Championships (1936–51)
 Scandinavian Covered Court Championships (1952–67)
 Scandinavian Open Indoor (1968–69)
 Scandinavian Indoor Tennis Championships (1970–73)
 Scandinavian Indoor Championships (1974–79)

See also
History of tennis

References

External links
tennisarchives.com

Tennis tournaments in Denmark
Tennis tournaments in Finland
Tennis tournaments in Norway
Tennis tournaments in Sweden
1936 establishments in Sweden
Defunct tennis tournaments in Europe
Indoor tennis tournaments
Recurring sporting events established in 1936
Recurring events disestablished in 1979
Wood court tennis tournaments